ABC Rocks is an American music video show broadcast on ABC from June 22, 1984, to August 2, 1985.  The thirty-minute show aired on Friday nights at midnight and featured popular rock videos by artists such as Prince, Billy Idol and David Bowie.  It is notable as ABC's attempt to produce a show comparable to cable's MTV and NBC's Friday Night Videos.

References

External links

1984 American television series debuts
1985 American television series endings
1980s American music television series
American Broadcasting Company original programming